Oisin Smyth (born 5 May 2000) is a Northern Irish professional footballer who plays for Oxford United as a midfielder.

Early and personal life
Smyth is from Derrymacash. His father Liam was also a footballer, active in the Irish League. His uncle Pat McGibbon was a Northern Ireland international.

Club career
Smyth began his career with Dungannon Swifts at the age of 12, making his senior debut in October 2018. He became club captain for the 2021–22 season. 

In January 2022, Smyth signed for League One club Oxford United having been linked with a move away from Dungannon Swifts the previous month. On 5 January 2023, Smyth joined National League club Solihull Moors on an initial one-month loan deal. He played three times for Solihull Moors before returning to his parent club.

International career
Smyth is a Northern Ireland under-21 youth international.

References

2000 births
Living people
Association footballers from Northern Ireland
Northern Ireland under-21 international footballers
Association football midfielders
Dungannon Swifts F.C. players
Oxford United F.C. players
Solihull Moors F.C. players
NIFL Premiership players
National League (English football) players
English Football League players